The Chief Scientist of South Australia is an independent advisory role to the Government of South Australia, providing advice to the Premier and Cabinet on matters of science, technology, innovation and research. The Chief Scientist chairs the South Australian Science Council and recommends to the government new members for the Council.

Incumbents

References

Advisory boards of the Government of South Australia
Science and technology in South Australia
Australian scientists